This is a list of notable Rastafari.

Early teachers
Leonard Howell
Joseph Hibbert
Archibald Dunkley
Sam Brown
Vernon Carrington
Charles Edwards
Mortimer Planner

Musicians
Bob Marley (1945–1981), musician and singer
Peter Tosh (1944–1987) musician and singer
Bunny Wailer (1947–2021), reggae singer
Max Romeo (1947–), reggae singer
 Junior Delgado (1958-2005), reggae singer 
 Beres Hammond (1955-), reggae singer
 Dennis Brown (1957-1999), reggae singer
Winston Rodney (Burning Spear) (1945–), musician and singer
Alpha Blondy, Ivorian reggae musician 
Alborosie, (1977-), Italian-Jamaican musician and singer
Ziggy Marley (1968–), musician and singer
Lucky Dube, South African reggae musician (1964–2007)
Evison Matafale, Malawian reggae musician (1969–2001)
Prince Far I (1945–1983), deejay
Buju Banton (1973–), dancehall and ragga musician and singer
Damian Marley (1978–), musician and singer
Ky-Mani Marley(1976–), musician and singer 
Stephen Marley (1972–), musician and singer
Julian Marley (1975–), musician and singer
Rita Marley (1946–), musician and singer
Rohan Marley (1972–), played college football
Milton Nascimento (1942–), Brazilian singer
Jah Shaka, sound system operator
Joseph Hill (1949–2006) musician and singer
Lincoln Thompson, (1949–1999), musician and composer
Cedric Myton, composer and musician
Ras Michael, musician and singer
Sizzla, musician and singer
Bad Brains, hardcore punk band
Pablo Moses, reggae singer
Wadada Leo Smith, jazz musician and composer
Jah Cure, Reggae singer
Anthony B, reggae singer and deejay
Richie Spice, reggae singer
Mutabaruka, poet and reggae musician
Augustus Pablo, (1954–1999) reggae musician and producer
Hans Söllner, German musician
Che Fu, Hip Hop, R&B and reggae Singer
Tigilau Ness, reggae singer
I Wayne, reggae artist/songwriter
Capleton, reggae artist
Soldiers of Jah Army, reggae band
Bushman, musician and singer
Junior Kelly, singer
Gregory Isaacs (1951–2010), reggae singer
Junior Reid, reggae singer
Dennis Brown (1957–1999), reggae singer
Barrington Levy, reggae singer
Yellowman, reggae dancehall singer
Gentleman, reggae singer
Don Carlos, reggae singer
Michael Prophet (1957–2017), roots reggae singer
Larry Marshall (1941–), roots reggae singer
Jacob Miller (1952–1980), musician and reggae singer
Nicodemus, reggae singer
Ini Kamoze (Cecil Campbell), reggae singer
Michael Rose, reggae singer
Junior Murvin, reggae singer
Sugar Minott (1956–2010), reggae singer
Capleton, reggae singer
Queen Ifrica, reggae singer
U Roy, Jamaican musician
Tribal Seeds, reggae band
Cocoa Tea, reggae singer
Chezidek, reggae singer
Dezarie, reggae singer
Junior Byles, reggae singer
Protoje, reggae singer
Turbulence, reggae singer
Lutan Fyah, reggae singer
Chronixx, reggae singer

Politicians
Ed "NJWeedman" Forchion, American cannabis rights activist
Nándor Tánczos, New Zealand politician
Sams'K Le Jah, Burkina Faso protest leader

Artists
Ras Daniel Heartman, Jamaican artist
Benjamin Zephaniah, poet

Sportspeople
Ricardo Gardner, Jamaican footballer
Thabo Mngomeni, South African footballer
Tafari Moore, English footballer

References

 
Rastafarians